"Gläns över sjö och strand" ("Shine Over Lakes and Shores") is the opening line for a poem written by Viktor Rydberg, appearing in the 1891 Vapensmeden. In the novel, the poem has no title. The title "Betlehems stjärna" originally appeared in 1893 when Alice Tegnér published music, turning the poem into a song. The title has also been used for later melodies.

References

External links
Gläns över sjö och strand: Swedish lyrics
Gläns över sjö och strand: English translation

1891 poems
1893 songs
Swedish Christmas songs
Swedish-language songs
Works by Viktor Rydberg
Hep Stars songs